As Above, So Below is a 2014 American horror film written and directed by John Erick Dowdle and co-written by his brother Drew. The title refers to the popular paraphrase of the second verse of the Emerald Tablet. It is presented as found footage of a documentary crew's experience exploring the Catacombs of Paris and was loosely based on the nine circles of Hell. The film was produced by Legendary Pictures and distributed by Universal Pictures, making it the first film in Legendary's deal with Universal. The film was released on August 29, 2014, and stars Perdita Weeks, Ben Feldman, Edwin Hodge, François Civil, Marion Lambert, and Ali Marhyar. The film received generally negative reviews from critics, but grossed $41 million against its $5 million budget.

Plot

Scarlett Marlowe is a young scholar, continuing her dead father's search for the philosopher's stone, a legendary alchemical substance discovered by Nicolas Flamel. The stone is capable of turning base metals into gold or silver and granting eternal life. Scarlett finds the "Rose Key" artifact in a cave slated for demolition, but after she sees a vision of a hanged man, the demolition begins and she narrowly escapes.

Scarlett travels to Paris. She enlists her former lover George and her cameraman Benji. Using codes from the key, they solve a riddle on Flamel's headstone and get coordinates pointing to the Catacombs of Paris. Scarlett tries to reach the location on an official tour, but it is off-limits. A stranger tells them a guide called Papillon will help them if they find him at a nearby party. Scarlett enlists Papillon, his girlfriend Souxie and his friend Zed.

Papillon takes the group to an off-limits entrance. George initially refuses to enter, but when a policeman confronts them, the group escapes into the caves. They encounter singing female cultists, including a woman they saw at the party. As the group crawls through a narrow tunnel, it collapses, trapping them and forcing them onward. The group finds a blocked tunnel, but Papillion explains people who go through that tunnel disappear. His friend La Taupe (i.e. "The Mole") is among the missing. He tries to take a different path, but the group somehow loops back to the blocked tunnel, and they decide to break through.

Inside, the group encounters La Taupe. He tells them going further down is the only way out. They eventually find a tomb with a preserved Templar Knight, a mound of treasure, and the Flamel Stone. After they take the stone, attempting to take the treasure triggers a trap and collapses the room. La Taupe seems lost under the rubble.

Using the Flamel Stone, Scarlett magically heals a wound on Souxie's arm. They find a drawing of a door on the ceiling along with a Gnostic Star of David, symbolizing "As above, so below", which reveals a hidden opening in the floor. Going through, they find a tunnel marked with the phrase "Abandon all hope, ye who enter here" in Greek, identical to the script on the entrance to Hell in Dante's Inferno.

On the other side of the tunnel, the group finds an upside-down reflection of the room they just left, where somehow La Taupe is waiting. He kills Souxie and disappears. Deeper in, the cultist from the party pushes Benji to his death. Papillon is then sucked into a burning car with an apparition of his brother inside, who looks just like the stranger who told Scarlett to find Papillon. The car implodes and buries Papillon in the floor. Scarlett, George, and Zed move on and see apparitions of terrifying spirits and demons. Statues in the wall come to life, and one rips open George's throat. Scarlett tries to heal the wound with the Flamel Stone, but cannot. She realizes she stole a false stone, and she must return it to its original place to find the real stone and heal George.

Scarlett races back, finding the terrain is now flooded with blood and covered in biting faces. When she returns the stone, she sees a mirror and realizes the true power of the Flamel Stone is within her. As she returns to George and Zed, she sees the same hanged man that she saw in Iran, and recognizes him as her father. She apologizes for ignoring his phone call shortly before he committed suicide, and her father vanishes. Scarlett then returns to George, healing him with a kiss. Chased by demons, the three survivors are cornered in front of a dark hole. Scarlett explains that they must jump in and confess their past sins to escape alive. George confesses that he failed to save his brother from drowning, and Zed confesses that he is refusing to claim his child. They jump into the hole and miraculously survive. They find a manhole at the bottom, which delivers them right side up to the streets of Paris. Scarlett and George hold each other while Zed walks away, finally safe. In an ending log, Scarlett says that she never sought treasure, only the truth.

Cast
 Perdita Weeks as Scarlett Marlowe, an accomplished scholar in search of the philosopher's stone. She is clever but reckless in her pursuit for the truth 
 Ben Feldman as George, Scarlett's ex, and an Aramaic translator with a hobby for breaking into old buildings to repair things
 Edwin Hodge as Benji, Scarlett's cameraman and tech specialist
 François Civil as Papillon, their guide through the catacombs of Paris
 Marion Lambert as Souxie, Papillon's girlfriend
 Ali Marhyar as Zed, Papillon's friend
 Pablo Nicomedes as La Taupe, Papillon's friend who lived in the Paris catacombs for five years until his disappearance down a disused tunnel
 Hamidreza Javdan as Reza
 Roger Van Hool as Scarlett's father, once a scholar in pursuit of the philosopher's stone, now deceased
 Samuel Aouizerate as Danny, George's younger brother who drowned when George was still a child
 Kaya Blocksage as The Curator

Production
With permission from the French authorities the film was shot in the real catacombs of Paris. There was very little use of props, as the actors had to use the environment around them. Production in the actual catacombs was difficult for the cast and especially the crew as there was no electricity or cell phone service in the centuries-old tunnels. As Ben Feldman suffered from claustrophobia, he had to keep taking breaks to cope.

Marketing and distribution
The first trailer of the film was revealed on April 24, 2014. YouTuber PewDiePie and his wife Marzia Bisognin promoted the film by embarking on a quest into the catacombs, where they would be scared in a variety of ways.

As Above, So Below was released on DVD and Blu-ray on December 2, 2014.

Reception

Critical response 
On Rotten Tomatoes, the film holds an approval rating of 28% based on 80 reviews, and an average rating of 4.70/10. The website's critical consensus reads, "After an intriguing setup that threatens to claw its way out of found-footage overkill, As Above, So Below plummets into clichéd mediocrity." On Metacritic, the film has a weighted average score of 39 out of 100 based on 24 critics, indicating "generally unfavorable reviews." Audiences polled by CinemaScore gave the film an average grade of "C−" on an A+ to F scale.

Peter Debruge gave the film a mixed review in Variety, writing, "It all makes for clumsy-fun escapism, not bad as end-of-summer chillers go, but small-time compared with other Legendary releases."  Debruge also called the ending "unspeakably corny."  Kyle Anderson's review in Entertainment Weekly stated, "As Above has some genuine scares.  The stakes begin as gut-wrenchingly real with the team feeling disoriented hundreds of meters beneath the streets, but the film gets downright silly once the caverns become malevolently sentient."  Bruce Demara wrote in The Toronto Star, "As Above, So Below has some good scares and a decent cast. But it's yet another found footage thriller, so jittery camera sequences may induce nausea."  Peter Bradshaw stated in The Guardian, "There are some interestingly contrived moments of claustrophobia and surreal lunacy, but this clichéd and slightly hand-me-down script neither scares nor amuses very satisfyingly."  Drew Hunt expressed similar sentiments in The Chicago Reader, writing "An intriguing and intensely creepy premise is squandered on this rudimentary found-footage horror film."  Terry Staunton gave the film a mildly positive review in Radio Times, stating, "It's a perfectly serviceable addition to the 'found footage' genre of chillers from director/co-writer John Erick Dowdle (Devil), who puts cameras in each character's helmet, allowing quick cuts from one scene to another. But despite the claustrophobia of the setting, he never quite racks up enough tension for a full-on fright-fest."  The entertainment oriented website JoBlo wrote, "Not the worst example of found footage by a long shot, and it moves a decent pace with a couple of good scares. However, this could have been a far more frightening feature if only it had expanded on its scary premise."

Box office
The film grossed $8.3 million its opening weekend, finishing in third place. It went on to gross $21.3 million in North America and $20.6 million in other territories, for a total gross of $41.9 million.

References

External links
 
 
 
 
 

2014 films
2014 horror films
2010s adventure films
2014 horror thriller films
American adventure films
American horror thriller films
Camcorder films
Films set in Paris
Films shot in Paris
Found footage films
Legendary Pictures films
Universal Pictures films
Films directed by John Erick Dowdle
Films produced by Thomas Tull
2010s English-language films
2010s French-language films
French-language American films
Films set in subterranea
2010s American films